The Manichaean Diagram of the Universe is a Yuan dynasty silk painting describing the cosmology of Manichaeism, in other words, the structure of universe according to Manichaean vision. The painting in vivid colours on a silk cloth (originally measuring approximately 158 by 60 centimetres) survives in three parts, whose proper relation to one another and digital reconstruction (shown here) was published by Zsuzsanna Gulácsi.

According to the team, this piece of art was probably produced by a painter from southern China (Zhejiang or Fujian province) around the period of Yuan dynasty, which ruled China from 1271 to 1368; and the only painting currently known that covers Manichaeism's cosmologic view in complete form. How and when it was transferred to Japan is a mystery.

Description
Under the Manichaean view of the universe, the world is formed by ten layers of heaven and eight layers of the Earth. The separated top section depicts paradise, below it are the sun (right) and moon palaces, which are shown in two circles. Then the ten layers of heaven, where angels, demons and the twelve zodiac signs are included. Below the ten firmaments of heaven are the eight layers of the Earth, the Mount Meru is shown as a mushroom-shaped mountain on the ground where humans live; and hell is depicted in the lowermost part.

Analysis

After carefully studying the painting, and comparing it with the Manichaean materials found in Xinjiang, the westernmost region of China, the members of Yoshida's research team concluded that the painting is Manichaean because it includes a priest wearing a white robe with red piping that is characteristic of Manichaean priests. According to the art historian Zsuzsanna Gulácsi, the white robed priest—the silhouette of whose face against the green halo—is a depiction of the prophet Mani.

In 2009, Professor Yoshida raised an idea that this painting might constitute a Chinese version of Mani's Book of Pictures, and subsequently by Gábor Kósa.

In her book Mani's Pictures: The Didactic Images of the Manichaeans from Sasanian Mesopotamia to Uygur Central Asia and Tang-Ming China, the Hungarian-born American art historian Zsuzsanna Gulácsi, who is also a specialist in Manichaean art, explaining the possible relation between this painting and Mani's Book of Pictures. She argues that this hanging scroll is not a canonical object in Manichaeism, because the canonical Manichaean images were only designed for picture books with documented heights ranging between 8 cm and 25 cm. After the introduction of hanging scrolls into Manichaean artistic production by the 10th century, it started to integrate a number of individual canonical images in one composite display. "The result was the emergence of modified canonical images. The Diagram of the Universe is an example of such a modified image."

Gulácsi designed a visual syntax with Jason BeDuhn to analyse the painting:

Gallery

Excursus

Eight silk hanging scrolls with Manichaean didactic images from southern China from between the 12th and the 15th centuries, which can be divided into four categories:
 Two single portraits (depicting Mani and Jesus)
 Icon of Mani
 Manichaean Painting of the Buddha Jesus
 One scroll depicting Salvation Theory
 Sermon on Mani's Teaching of Salvation
 Four scrolls depicting Prophetology
 Mani's Parents
 Birth of Mani
 Episodes from Mani's Missionary Work
 Mani's Community Established
 One scroll depicting Cosmology
 Manichaean Diagram of the Universe

See also
 Chinese Manichaeism

References

External links

Chinese Manichaean art
Chinese paintings
Religious paintings
13th-century paintings
14th-century paintings
Yuan dynasty